is a former Japanese football player.

Career
In 1999, Tamano joined Nike Premier Cup upon transfer to Atlético Madrid youth team. Although had an opportunity for promotion to B level team Atlético Madrid B, he had to turn down the offer as he didn't hold a Spanish passport.

In 2002, Tamano returned to Japan and joined Tokyo Verdy youth team. He debuted in top team in 2002 J.League Cup in May. After the debut, he played several matches as offensive midfielder every season. Although he played many matches as substitute midfielder in 2005, Verdy was relegated to J2 League end of 2005 season. In 2006, he moved to J2 club Tokushima Vortis. He became a regular player and played many matches in 2006. In 2007, he moved to newly was promoted to J1 League club, Yokohama FC. However he could not play many matches and Yokohama finished at the bottom place in 2007 season. In 2008, he re-joined Tokushima Vortis and played as regular player again. In 2009, he moved to Thespa Kusatsu. However he could not play many matches and retired end of 2009 season.

Club statistics

References

External links

1984 births
Living people
Association football people from Tokyo
Japanese footballers
J1 League players
J2 League players
Tokyo Verdy players
Tokushima Vortis players
Yokohama FC players
Thespakusatsu Gunma players
Association football midfielders